Nagorik is a Bangladeshi Bengali-language privately owned satellite and cable television channel owned by Jadoo Media Limited, and is based in Khilkhet, Dhaka. It began operations on 1 March 2018, with the slogan, "Television Noy, Somporko" (টেলিভিশন নয়, সম্পর্ক). Nagorik claims that they do not compete with local Bangladeshi television channels, and instead compete with foreign television channels by working with the local ones.

History

Licensing and initiation
Nagorik was initially licensed to Jadoo Media Limited, which at the time was owned by businessman Annisul Huq, by the Bangladesh Telecommunication Regulatory Commission in 2013 as 'Jadoo TV'. During its initiation, Nagorik had produced several television series to be aired for later. Abdun Noor Tushar later joined the channel as its CEO. The channel received its frequency allocation in January 2015.

Launch
Nagorik began test transmissions on 6 February 2018, and later officially began broadcasting on 1 March of the same year at 19:00 (BST), with its debut program being "Swapno Simahin", being inaugurated at the Bangabandhu International Conference Center in Dhaka. 

During its launch, Rubana Huq, the wife of Annisul Huq and the managing director of Nagorik, recalled the memory of her late husband. Tofail Ahmed, the Minister of Commerce, hoped that Nagorik would care for the spirit of the Liberation War and highlight the development of Bangladesh. Minister of Information Hasanul Haq Inu also hoped that the channel would meet the demand of its audience. 

The channel's initial programming line consisted of four drama television series, live music show Nagorik Café, animated series Superman, health-related series Deho Ghori, cooking show Mariar Rannaghor, travel series Soleman Hazari, and many more. Alongside Bangladesh Television and Maasranga Television, the channel was FIFA's official broadcast partner in Bangladesh for the 2018 World Cup. On 27 October 2018, Nagorik began airing Chacha Bahinir Ajob Kahini, which is considered to be the first CGI animated television series to be produced in Bangladesh.

On 4 December 2018, dance reality television series Bajlo Jhumur Tarar Nupur premiered on Nagorik. In February 2019, Nagorik premiered local drama series Bangi Television. On 17 March 2019, Turkish drama series Siyah İnci premiered on the channel under the name Maria. In December 2019, Nagorik, along with three other Bangladeshi television channels, signed an agreement with UNICEF to air programming regarding children's issues.

To celebrate Eid al-Fitr of 2020, Nagorik had broadcast seven Hollywood films, including the ones from the Spider-Man, Terminator, and Charlie's Angels film franchises. Chander Hat, starring actor and director Salauddin Lavlu, premiered on Nagorik on 2 December 2020. On 1 March 2021, Turkish drama Binbir Gece, with its title being localized as Sahasra Ek Rajani, premiered on the channel. It was also made available for streaming on Bongo BD. In June 2021, two local dramas, Corporate Bhalobasha and Google Village, debuted on Nagorik.

Programming
Nagorik's programming line is diverse, consisting of dramas, music, health, cartoons, and many more. At its launch, four dramas have premiered on the channel.

List of programming

Drama 
 Akash Meghe Dhaka
 Ami Tumi Se
 Bangi Television
 Binbir Gece (title localized as 'Sahasra Ek Rajani')
 Candy Crush
 Chander Hat
 Corporate Bhalobasha
 Ek Pa Du Pa
 Google Vilage
 Josnamoyi
 Lipstick
 Siyaasat (title localized as Samrat Jahangir)
 Siyah İnci (title localized as Maria)
 Shoshur Aloy Modhur Aloy

Animated 
 Batman: The Animated Series
 Chacha Bahinir Ajob Kahini
 Superman: The Animated Series

Cooking 
 Mariar Rannaghor
 Rannar Expert

Infotainment 
 Bizzcussion
 Bola Na Bola
 Deho Ghori
 Fisfas
 Jogfol
 Nagorik Binodon
 Samadhan Jatra
 Soleman Hazari

Lifestyle 
 Ghore Baire

Musical 
 Bajlo Jhumur Tarar Nupur
 Banglabaul
 Gaan Baksho
 House Views
 Music Café
 Nagorik Café

References

Television channels in Bangladesh
Television channels and stations established in 2018
Mass media in Dhaka
2018 establishments in Bangladesh